Rashad Atia  (born ) is an Egyptian male volleyball player. He was part of the Egypt men's national volleyball team at the 2014 FIVB Volleyball Men's World Championship in Poland. He played for Zamalek.

Clubs
 Zamalek (2014)

References

1986 births
Living people
Egyptian men's volleyball players
Place of birth missing (living people)